The First Massimov Cabinet was the 7th government of Kazakhstan, led by Prime Minister Karim Massimov. The change in cabinet was a result of the 2007 Kazakh political shakeup where Massimov's predecessor Daniyal Akhmetov resigned unexpectedly from office on 8 January 2007. Observers believed that it was due to Akhmetov's exhaustion and increasing criticism from President Nursultan Nazarbayev over Akhmetov's oversight of the economy. Nazarbayev nominated Massimov to be the Prime Minister on 9 January who was then confirmed by the Parliament the next day on 10 January. 

The government lasted until 24 September 2012, when Massimov was appointed as the Head of the Presidential Administration, making him the longest person in Kazakhstan to hold office as the Prime Minister. Massimov was succeeded by his First Deputy Serik Akhmetov that day, after being approved by the Parliament to form a new cabinet.

Composition

References 

Cabinets of Kazakhstan
2007 in Kazakhstan
Cabinets established in 2007
2007 establishments in Kazakhstan